Daniel Henrich (born 29 September 1991) is a German footballer who plays for Türk Gücü Friedberg in the Hessenliga.

References

External links

Daniel Henrich at Fupa

1991 births
Footballers from Frankfurt
Living people
German footballers
Association football midfielders
Kickers Offenbach players
FSV Frankfurt players
SC Hessen Dreieich players
3. Liga players
Regionalliga players
Hessenliga players